The Taitung Line, also known as the Hua-Tung line, is the southern section of the Eastern Line of the Taiwan Railways Administration. The line starts at the Hualien station and ends at the Taitung station. It is 161.5 km long, including the main segment of 155.7 km between Hualien and Taitung.

The coastal branch lines of Hualien and Taitung were discarded after the broadening plan in 1982. The broadcasts of the station names on Taitung line are made in five languages: Mandarin, Taiwanese Hokkien, Hakka, English, and Amis. The Taitung Line is the only line in Taiwan where broadcasts are made in the Amis language.

History 
The north segment from Karenkō (now Hualien City) to Poshiko (then Tamazato, now Yuli) was built in 1909 and completed in 1917. The south segment from Hinan (then Taitō, now Taitung City) to Rirō (now Guanshan) was opened in 1919 by the Taitō Development Company.

In 1922, the Taitō Development Company bought the railroad from Karenkō to Tamazato and named it the "Taitō North Line", while the south segment from Taitō to Rirō was named the "Taitō South Line."

The construction of the connecting railway between Tamazato to Rirō began in 1921 and completed in 1926, after which the total length of the line from Karenkō (Hualien City) to Taitō (Taitung City) was 171.8 km.

In 1966, the Kuang-Hua Express (光華號) utilizing diesel multiple units started service on the line, and greatly shortening the travel time from Hualien to Taitung from 6–7 hours to 3–4 hours.

Its gauge was changed from  narrow gauge to  gauge in 1982 and connected with North-link line, after which the old Hualien Station was abandoned and replaced by the Hualien railway station that is used now. The site of old Hualian Station was eventually turned into Dongdamen Night Market in 2015, while the disused right of way has been partially turned into a pedestrian area.

In 2007, the Environmental Protection Administration gave the line a conditional pass for an electrification project, which would boost the operating speed from 110 km/hr to 130 km/hr. In 2009, construction began on electrification work, with NT$15.5 billion set aside for the project. Electrification work was completed in late 2013 with the inauguration of electric services taking place in late June 2014.

The section between Nanping and Wanrong railway stations was to be upgraded from a single-track railway to a dual-track railway and was expected to be completed by December 2020. With the existing double-track sections from Shoufeng to Nanping railway station and from Wanrong to Guangfu railway stations, it was expected that service frequency could be improved, shortening wait times.

On October 12 2020, the Ministry of Transport has approved and intends to carry out upgrading works on the Taitung Line to ensure that the entire line is double-tracked. As 69% of the line is still currently single-tracked, the project is expected to shorten wait times by up to 90 minutes with up to 16 more train services each day. Some trips can be reduced by up to 50 minutes. With an increase of 17,000 passengers per day, the dual-track railway project is expected to cost NT$25.429 billion, which will be completed 7 years after the environmental impact assessment and comprehensive planning are approved.

The Railway Bureau has stated that the project will be carried out in 2 phases. Phase 1 will include the sections north of Yuli (Hualien - Shoufeng, Guangfu - Ruisui and Sanmin - Yuli) and the section between Taitung and Zhiben and is expected to be completed by 2026. Phase 2 will include the remaining sections of the line and is expected to be completed by 2027.

Electrification of the Hualien-Taitung Line
Together with the electrification of the Hualien-Taitung Line, the following stations were upgraded.

 General Reconstruction
 Completed - Zhixue, Pinghe, Fengtian, Nanping, Fenglin, Wanrong, Guangfu, Dafu, Fuyuan, Ruisui, Sanmin, Yuli, Dongli, Dongzhu, Fuli, Chishang, Haiduan, Guanshan, Ruihe, Ruiyuan, Luye, Shanli, Taitung
 Elevated Station
 Under Construction - Hualien
 Under Planning - Ji’an
 Completed - Shoufeng
 Underground Station
 Completed - Linrong Shin Kong

Stations

References 

TRA routes
2 ft 6 in gauge railways in Taiwan
3 ft 6 in gauge railways in Taiwan